Julie Larson (b. c. 1960) is an American cartoonist, most well known for her single panel comic strip The Dinette Set. The panel began in 1990 under the title Suburban Torture, and was syndicated from 1997 to 2015. The comic features the Penny family and their banal existence in American suburbia.

Larson grew up in a family of five kids in Lincoln, Illinois.  Drawing was her hobby.

Larson played competitive tennis until college. She earned a B.S. in Architecture from the University of Illinois at Urbana–Champaign and spent the next eight years working in the design field. In 1989, after the first of her three daughters was born, Larson and her family moved from Chicago to the suburbs.

She began Suburban Torture in 1990, offering a satire on middle class culture. With the title changed to The Dinette Set, the panel became syndicated in 1997.

According to Larson's daughter, cartoon characters never age — however the writers do. This is why she put the curtain down on Crustwood and "The Dinette Set " in November 2015 to rest and retire.

Notes

External links
About Julie Larson — old site author information
The Dinette Set on GoComics.com

Year of birth missing (living people)
Living people
American women cartoonists
University of Illinois alumni
American cartoonists
21st-century American women